The RG-19 Caddie is a prototype Armoured Personnel carrier manufactured by TFM of South Africa. The company was later taken over by Reunert Defence OMC.

Production history
It was developed in 1982 as a private venture by TFM and was based on the Unimog 416 chassis.

See also
 Mamba APC
 RCV-9
 RG-12
 RG-31
 RG-32
 RG-33
 RG-34
 RG-35

Armoured personnel carriers of South Africa
Cold War military equipment of South Africa